In the 2012–13 season, ES Sétif competed in the Ligue 1 for the 43rd season, as well as the Algerian Cup.  It was their 15th consecutive season in the top flight of Algerian football. They competed in Ligue 1, the CAF Champions League and Algerian Cup.

Squad list
Players and squad numbers last updated on 18 November 2010.Note: Flags indicate national team as has been defined under FIFA eligibility rules. Players may hold more than one non-FIFA nationality.

Competitions

Overview

{| class="wikitable" style="text-align: center"
|-
!rowspan=2|Competition
!colspan=8|Record
!rowspan=2|Started round
!rowspan=2|Final position / round
!rowspan=2|First match	
!rowspan=2|Last match
|-
!
!
!
!
!
!
!
!
|-
| Ligue 1

|  
| style="background:gold;"| Winners
| 15 September 2012
| 21 May 2013
|-
| Algerian Cup

| Round of 64 
| Semi-final
| 14 December 2012
| 12 April 2013
|-
| Champions League

| First round 
| Second round
| 16 March 2013
| 3 May 2013
|-
| Confederation Cup

| colspan=2| Play-off round 
| 17 May 2013
| 1 June 2013
|-
! Total

Ligue 1

League table

Results summary

Results by round

Matches

Algerian Cup

Champions League

First round

Second round

Confederation Cup

Play-off round

Squad information

Playing statistics

|-
! colspan=14 style=background:#dcdcdc; text-align:center| Goalkeepers

|-
! colspan=14 style=background:#dcdcdc; text-align:center| Defenders

|-
! colspan=14 style=background:#dcdcdc; text-align:center| Midfielders

|-
! colspan=14 style=background:#dcdcdc; text-align:center| Forwards

|-
! colspan=14 style=background:#dcdcdc; text-align:center| Players transferred out during the season

Goalscorers

Includes all competitive matches. The list is sorted alphabetically by surname when total goals are equal.

Transfers

In

Out

References

External links
 2012–13 ES Sétif season at dzfoot.com 

ES Sétif seasons
Algerian football clubs 2012–13 season